Batram Suri (born 2 November 1971) is a Solomon Islands professional footballer who played as either a striker or a midfielder. As one of the few Solomon Islandsers he played club football in New Zealand. He has almost 50 caps for the national team of the Solomon Islands. At the moment, he is the head coach of the Solomon Islands women's national football team.

Playing career

Club
Suri is the most well-known player to come out of the Solomon Islands and has previously played in New Zealand for Richmond Athletic and the Football Kingz amongst other clubs (now the New Zealand Knights), in Fiji and Tahiti and has also played for Laugu FC in his native country.

International
Suri is also one of the Solomon Islands national football team's most successful players helping them reach the oceanic play-off final against Australia in 2005. He made his debut in 1992 and collected over 40 caps, also scoring a fair share of goals.

Managerial career
On 16 June 2019, Suri was appointed as head coach of the Solomon Islands U-23 to guide them in the 2019 OFC Men's Olympic Qualifying Tournament from 21 September - 5 October 2019, to try to qualify for the 2020 Summer Olympics.

Achievements
 Solomon Islands Player of the Year (1994)
 New Zealand Player of the Year (1996)
 New Zealand Top Goalscorer (1997 and 1998)
 Oceanian Player of the Year: Fourth place (1996), Tenth place (1997 and 1998), Twelfth place (2002)

References

External links
 

1972 births
Living people
Association football forwards
Association football midfielders
Solomon Islands footballers
Solomon Islands international footballers
Solomon Islands expatriate footballers
Football Kingz F.C. players
Nelson Suburbs players
Nadi F.C. players
1996 OFC Nations Cup players
2000 OFC Nations Cup players
2002 OFC Nations Cup players
2004 OFC Nations Cup players
Expatriate footballers in Fiji
Expatriate footballers in Vanuatu
Expatriate footballers in French Polynesia
Expatriate association footballers in New Zealand
Solomon Islands expatriate sportspeople in Fiji
Solomon Islands expatriate sportspeople in Vanuatu
Solomon Islands expatriate sportspeople in French Polynesia
Solomon Islands expatriate sportspeople in New Zealand
Women's national association football team managers